Shamb is a village in the Sisian Municipality of the Syunik Province in Armenia.

Gallery

References 

Populated places in Syunik Province